New Mansoura University (Arabic: جامعة المنصورة الجديدة) is a national, non-profit Egyptian university located in New Mansoura in Dakahlia. The university includes 8 faculties in different fields of study. It was established by presidential decree in August 2020. It started accepting students in 2021.

Location 
New Mansoura University is located in the new planned city of New Mansoura, overlooking the International Coastal Road.

Studying System 
The study at the university is based on the credit hour system that allows students to choose the courses they register to study in each semester, under academic guidance that tracks the student’s progress and ability to continue their studies.

In May 2021, the NMU signed a protocol with Mansoura University that aims to promote cooperation with latter in "the fields of training and continuing medical education, and implement training programs of mutual interest and taking the benefit of the available capacities of Mansoura University's hospitals."

Faculties and centers 
As of 2021, NMU contains 8 faculties, and offers 28 programs, with 6 more faculties under construction.

Faculties:

 Faculty of Business
 Faculty of International Legal Transactions
 Faculty of Engineering
 Faculty of Computer Science
 Faculty of Basic Sciences
 Faculty of Medicine
 Faculty of Dental Medicine
 Faculty of Pharmacy

Faculties under construction
 Faculty of Applied Health Technology
 Faculty of Nursing
 Faculty of Social and Human Sciences
 Faculty of Mass Communication
 Faculty of Postgraduate Studies

Faculty of Engineering 
The Faculty consists of the following programs:
Mechanical Engineering:
Aeronautical & Aerospace Engineering Program.
Product Development Engineering Program.
Mechatronics Engineering Program.
Textile Engineering Program.
Electrical Engineering:
Biomedical Engineering Program.
Energy Engineering & Energy Management Program.
Computer Engineering Program.
Artificial Intelligence Engineering Program.
Petroleum & Gas Engineering Program.
Environmental Architecture & Building Technology Program.
Engineering & Technology Implementation of Civil Engineering Program.

References 

Universities in Egypt
Research institutes in Egypt
Science and technology in Egypt
Dakahlia Governorate
Educational institutions established in 2021
2020s establishments in Egypt